Neue Galerie may refer to:

 New Gallery (Kassel), an art museum in Kassel, Germany
 Neue Galerie (Vienna), now the Galerie St. Etienne in New York, an art gallery established by Otto Kallir in 1923 in Austria
 Neue Galerie Graz, a modern art museum in Graz, Austria; part of the Universalmuseum Joanneum
 Neue Galerie New York, an art museum in New York, US
 Lentos Art Museum, successor to the Neue Galerie der Stadt Linz in Austria

See also
 Galerie nächst St. Stephan, an art gallery in Vienna, Austria, in the space formerly occupied by Otto Kallir's Neue Gallery